Tolipir National Park is a protected area located in the Rawlakot tehsil of Poonch District in the state of Azad Jammu and Kashmir, Pakistan. The park is home to a wide variety of flora and fauna, including a number of endangered species such as the Himalayan black bear, leopard, and snow leopard.

The park is situated in the western Himalayan mountain range, at an altitude of between 1,500 and 7,000 meters above sea level. The area is characterized by rugged terrain and steep mountain slopes, with a number of peaks rising above 6,000 meters. The climate is cold and temperate, with heavy snowfall in the winter and mild summers. The park is surrounded by the Toli Pir, Shounter, and Barmoghlasht valleys, and is fed by the Toli Pir stream, which flows through the park.

References

National parks of Pakistan
Poonch District, Pakistan
Protected areas of Azad Kashmir